The Beatles at the Hollywood Bowl is a live album by the Beatles, released in May 1977, featuring songs compiled from three performances recorded at the Hollywood Bowl in August 1964 and August 1965. The album was released by Capitol Records in the United States and Canada and on the Parlophone label in the United Kingdom. It was the band's first official live recording. A remixed, remastered, and expanded version of the album, retitled Live at the Hollywood Bowl, was released on 9 September 2016, on CD for the first time, to coincide with the release of the documentary film The Beatles: Eight Days a Week, directed by Ron Howard.

Background

Capitol Records considered recording the Beatles' February 1964 concert at Carnegie Hall in New York, but it could not get the necessary approval from the American Federation of Musicians. Six months later, KRLA DJ Bob Eubanks booked the band's performance of 23 August at the Hollywood Bowl, in Los Angeles, where Capitol recorded their performance with the aim of releasing a live album in America. The sound quality of the tapes proved to be inadequate for commercial release, however, although Capitol used a 48-second excerpt of "Twist and Shout" from the concert on the 1964 documentary album The Beatles' Story.

High-quality black-and-white film of the 1964 show was also made and preserved. Excerpts of "All My Loving" and "She Loves You" from the 23 August 1964 performance appeared in The Beatles Anthology documentary series (1995).

When the Beatles returned to the Hollywood Bowl a year later, during their 1965 American tour, Capitol recorded two performances by the group at the same venue. The sound quality of the 1965 recordings was equally disappointing.

The Beatles were among the few major recording artists of the 1960s not to have issued a live album. Consequently, among Beatles fans, pent-up demand for a concert album continued to build. John Lennon set off a minor frenzy when, in a 1971 Rolling Stone interview, he incorrectly identified an obscure Italian compilation album, The Beatles in Italy, as a live recording ("There's one in Italy apparently, that somebody recorded there"). Despite the obvious demand for a live album, the tapes from the three Hollywood Bowl performances lay untouched in a Capitol vault. In 1971, after American record producer Phil Spector's salvaging of the Get Back tapes, which was released as the group's Let It Be album, the Hollywood Bowl tapes were given to him to see whether he could fashion an album from the material. Either Spector did not complete the job or his production was unsatisfactory, and the tapes sat unreleased for another six years.

A complete tape of the August 1964 performance found its way out of the Capitol vault in the early 1970s and was the basis of a popular bootleg LP, Back in 64 at the Hollywood Bowl. The audio, while below professional release standards, was more than adequate for desperate hardcore fans and served for years as the standard recording of the summer 1964 tour.

Finally, with a rival record label's impending release of the Live! at the Star-Club in Hamburg, Germany; 1962 album, consisting of a 15-year-old, poor-quality mono concert recording of the group performing in the Star-Club in Hamburg, Capitol Records' president, Bhaskar Menon, decided to revisit the Hollywood Bowl recordings. Beatles producer George Martin was handed the tapes and asked to compile a listenable "official" live album.

When Martin heard the tapes, he was impressed by the performances but disappointed by the sound quality. In working on the three-track Hollywood Bowl concert tapes, Martin discovered quite a challenge. The first difficulty was finding a working three-track machine with which to play them. Once he found one, he discovered that the machine overheated when it was running, melting the magnetic tape. Martin and recording engineer Geoff Emerick came up with the solution of blowing air from a vacuum cleaner to keep the tape deck cool whilst the recordings were transferred to 16-track tape for filtering, equalisation, editing, and mixing.

Although the original album sleeve says that the recordings were all made on 23 August 1964 and 30 August 1965, "Ticket to Ride" and "Help!" were recorded on 29 August 1965, and "Dizzy Miss Lizzy" is a composite using parts from both nights in 1965.

A number of songs performed at the 23 August 1964 and 30 August 1965 concerts were not included on the album. Songs from the 23 August 1964 show that were not on the album are "Twist and Shout", "You Can't Do That", "Can't Buy Me Love", "If I Fell", "I Want to Hold Your Hand", and "A Hard Day's Night". Songs from the 30 August 1965 show that were not on the album are "I Feel Fine", "Everybody's Trying to Be My Baby", "Baby's in Black", "I Wanna Be Your Man", and "I'm Down". "Baby's in Black" from the 30 August 1965 concert was issued as the B-side of the "Real Love" single (1996), and "I Want to Hold Your Hand" from the 1964 concert was mixed into the studio version of the song for the Love album (2006). Those two performances, along with the 1964 performance of "You Can't Do That" and the 30 August 1965 "Everybody's Trying to Be My Baby", were included on Live at the Hollywood Bowl, in 2016.

Release
The album was originally released as a vinyl LP in 4 May 1977. Though the recordings were 12 and 13 years old, the album reached number one on the New Musical Express chart in the UK and number two on the Billboard chart in the US. In France, a single was released featuring two songs from the LP: "Ticket to Ride" with "Dizzy Miss Lizzy" on the B-side.

The original 1977 album was also officially released simultaneously on 8-track tape and cassette but was not officially released on compact disc until 9 September 2016, when it was re-released worldwide as Live at the Hollywood Bowl. Shortly before the re-release date, a number of tracks were available for purchase and streaming early, and the album was available for pre-order on the iTunes Store. The re-released album was simultaneously released as a digital download and made available on streaming services. It was also released on vinyl on 18 November 2016.

A music video of the performance of "Boys" was released to promote the remixed album.

Before the official digital release of the album, bootleggers circulated transfers of the LP, and complete recordings of the three concerts, on CD and the Internet.

Live at the Hollywood Bowl

Live at the Hollywood Bowl is a remixed and remastered version of the album, released on 9 September 2016 to coincide with the release of The Beatles: Eight Days a Week. It includes four additional songs not found on the original release. According to the producer, Giles Martin, son of the Beatles' original producer, George Martin, "Capitol Studios called saying they'd discovered some Hollywood Bowl three track tapes in their archive. We transferred them and noticed an improvement over the tapes we've kept in the London archive. Alongside this I'd been working for some time with a team headed by technical engineer James Clarke on demix technology, the ability to remove and separate sounds from a single track." It was released on 9 September 2016, seven years to the day after the release of the band's remastered core catalogue and The Beatles: Rock Band.

One of the bonus tracks on the album is "Baby's in Black" from the "Real Love" single CD, which was previously unavailable on an album or as a digital download.

Critical reception

The Beatles at the Hollywood Bowl was voted the 26th best record of 1977 in the Pazz & Jop, an annual poll of American critics published by The Village Voice. Robert Christgau, the poll's supervisor, ranked it 12th on his own year-end list, and in a review for the newspaper, he wrote:

In The Rolling Stone Album Guide (2004), Rob Sheffield called the record "a loving tribute to the screaming girl fans who drown out the band in these 1964–65 shows; those girls were heroes on the rock & roll frontier, and they deserve to be the lead instrument on a Beatles album of their own." AllMusic critic Richard S. Ginell was impressed by the Beatles' performances under the chaotic circumstances, although he lamented the sound quality and separation from the crowd noise, citing it as a possible reason for the record remaining out of print.

Track listing

Personnel
John Lennon – lead and backing vocals, rhythm guitar
Paul McCartney – lead and backing vocals, bass guitar
George Harrison – lead guitar, backing vocals, lead vocals on "Roll Over Beethoven" and "Everybody's Trying to Be My Baby"
Ringo Starr – drums, lead vocals on "Boys"

Charts

Weekly charts

Year-end charts

Certifications

See also
 Live at the Hollywood Bowl (disambiguation), for other artists' performances at the Hollywood Bowl

References

External links
Gatefold and back cover
Live at the Hollywood Bowl by Dr. Ebbett

1977 live albums
Albums arranged by George Martin
Albums produced by George Martin
Albums produced by Giles Martin
Albums produced by Voyle Gilmore
Albums recorded at the Hollywood Bowl
Apple Records live albums
Capitol Records live albums
Parlophone live albums
The Beatles live albums
Universal Music Group live albums